is a Japanese tarento who is a former member of SKE48's Team KII.

Career 

Mastumura applied for SKE48's 2nd generation auditions in March 2009 but failed to make the cut. She passed SKE48's 3rd generation auditions on 13 November 2009. During March 2012, Matsumura was included in the Google+ selection project where she would be involved for the first time with an AKB48 single ("Manatsu no Sounds Good!") for the B-side song "Gugutasu no Sora". The Google+ selection project was a promotion project involving 48 Group members selected by Yasushi Akimoto who had used Google+ to best portray their personality. Prior to this project Matsumura had gained some notoriety using Google+ by most notably regularly uploading a self-created video series titled . The magazine Weekly Playboy first published a weekly serial  about SKE48's members and activities for its 23 April release written by Matsumura. On 6 June 2012 the fourth AKB48 general election event was held at the Nippon Budokan indoor arena and was used to determine members who would partake in AKB48's 27th single (Gingham Check) via fan voting. Matsumura was able to obtain 9030 votes placing her 34th and able to participate in a B-side song for the group of members ranked 33rd to 48th collectively called "Next girls". The Next girls were also included in a promotion campaign which involved a television advertisement for the JOYSOUND karaoke brand name.  Matsumura included as one of her submissions the only video display for an art exhibition held between 15 June to the 8th of July 2012 showcasing works from various 48 Group members. The video was a self made documentary involving the SKE48 trainees as they rehearsed for a new stage production.

In April 2013, she earned the title of Lifetime Honorary SKE48 Kenkyuusei since she decided to stay as a trainee member for the rest of her career in SKE48. In the 2013 general elections, she placed 24th. In October 2013, Matsumura released her first indie solo single, which was produced by HKT48 member Rino Sashihara. The single's first press was only released in 1,000 copies, and Matsumura sold all 1,000 singles personally to fans.

In the 2014 general elections, she increased her rank and placed 17th.

Matsumura's second SKE48 Senbatsu was for the single Coquettish Jūtai Chū. Her previous senbatsu single was "Kiss Datte Hidarikiki".

On 18 September 2018, Matsumura announced that she would be leaving the group. On 5 February 2019, her graduation concert was held at Omiya Sonic City. She officially graduated from the group on 2 May 2019. She currently continues to work in the entertainment industry as a freelancer.

Personal life 
On 28 June 2020, Matsumura announced her marriage to a non-celebrity, though the wedding ceremony was not held until September 2022, due to delays brought upon by the COVID-19 pandemic.

Discography

Solo singles

SKE48 singles

AKB48 singles

Appearances

Stage units
SKE48 Kenkyuusei Stage 
 
 
 
 
SKE48 Kenkyuusei Stage 
 
SKE48 Kenkyuusei Stage

TV variety
  (2011–2013)
  (2011-2012)
  (2013)
  (2013-2014)
  (2013)
  (2013)
 AKB48SHOW! (2013– )
  (2014)
  (2014-2015)

TV dramas
  (2015), Zakobosu

Musicals
 AKB49 Stage Play (2014)

References

External links
 
 

1990 births
Living people
Japanese idols
Japanese women pop singers
Musicians from Saitama Prefecture
SKE48 members
Ironman Heavymetalweight Champions